Christine of Hesse (29 June 1543 – 13 May 1604) was Duchess consort of Holstein-Gottorp as the spouse of Duke Adolf of Holstein-Gottorp. She exerted some political influence as a widow after 1586.

Biography
Christine was born in Kassel as a daughter of Landgrave Philip I of Hesse and his spouse Christine of Saxony. She was given a strict Protestant upbringing by her aunt Elizabeth, Dowager Duchess of Saxony.

Christine received a proposal from King Eric XIV of Sweden, but this did not come about.  Her wedding celebration resulted in a scandal, when the guests at the wedding reception consumed too much alcohol. In 1565, the Gottorf Castle was destroyed by fire, which cost her her personal possessions.

As duchess, Christine supported churches and schools and scholarships to poor students in theology. She was interested in medicine, and also manufactured her own medicines.

As a widow after 1586, Christine defended the rights of her son Philip against the council.

Christine composed the psalm-book Geistliche Psalmen und Lieder (1590).

Family and children
On 17 December 1564 Christine was married to Duke Adolf of Holstein-Gottorp and had the following children:
 Frederick II (21 April 1568 – 15 June 1587).
 Sophia (1 June 1569 – 14 November 1634), married on 17 February 1588 to John VII, Duke of Mecklenburg-Schwerin.
 Philip (10 August 1570 – 18 October 1590).
 Christina (13 April 1573 – 8 December 1625), married on 27 August 1592 to King Charles IX of Sweden.
 John Adolph (27 February 1575 – 31 March 1616).
 Anna (27 February 1575 – 24 April 1625), married 28 January 1598 to Count Enno III of Ostfriesland.
 Christian, died young in 1577.
 Agnes (20 December 1578 – 1627).
 John Frederick, prince-bishop of Bremen, Lübeck and Verden, (1 September 1579 – 3 September 1634).
Through her daughters Sophia and Anna, she is an ancestor of British Monarch Charles III.

Ancestors

External links
 
  Article in the ABD

|-

1543 births
1604 deaths
16th-century German women writers
16th-century German writers
17th-century German people
17th-century philanthropists
17th-century German women
Duchesses of Holstein-Gottorp
German Protestant hymnwriters
German philanthropists
German women philanthropists
House of Holstein-Gottorp
Patrons of schools
German women writers
Women hymnwriters
Daughters of monarchs